Lindsay Michelle Mendez (born March 1, 1983) is an American actress and singer, best known for her work in American musical theatre.

Mendez won the 2018 Tony Award for Best Featured Actress in a Musical for her performance as Carrie Pipperidge in a Broadway revival of Carousel. Her other credits on Broadway include Elphaba in Wicked (performing during the production's tenth anniversary), Godspell, and Jan in Grease.

Beginning in September 2019, Mendez co-stars on the CBS drama series All Rise as court stenographer Sara Castillo. Although CBS cancelled season 3 of All Rise in early 2021, it was shortly thereafter announced that it will resume airing on the Oprah Winfrey Network in 2022.

Life and career
Mendez was born in Norwalk, California. Her father is of Mexican descent and her mother is of Russian Jewish ancestry. She played Lizzie in a preview of "A Little More Alive", written by Nick Blaemire, in Kansas City. Other credits include roles in The Marvelous Wonderettes, 35MM, Jacques Brel is Alive and Well and Living in Paris, and Princesses.

In 2012, Mendez appeared opposite Derek Klena in Dogfight as Eddie and Rose, and in Wicked as Fiyero and Elphaba. The two frequently perform together at the Broadway supper club 54 Below. Mendez sings jazz and blues at other cabarets and dining clubs with pianist Marco Paguia. The two released a jazz album entitled "This Time" in 2013. Mendez, along with composer Ryan Scott Oliver, founded and runs Actor Therapy: a five-week training experience for young actors in NYC. For her role as Rose Fenny in Off-Broadway's Dogfight, she was nominated for the 2013 Drama League Award for Distinguished Performance, the 2013 Drama Desk Award for Outstanding Actress in a Musical, and the 2013 Outer Critics Circle Award for Outstanding Actress in a Musical.

In 2014, Mendez played Naomi Rodriguez in Lin Manuel Miranda's one-act musical 21 Chump Street and then in 2015, Laura in the play Significant Other.

While performing in Wicked, Mendez filmed a series of video blogs for Broadway.com entitled "Fly Girl: Backstage at Wicked with Lindsay Mendez", giving an inside look at the smash musical, including interviews with current cast members, glimpses of costumes, sets, props, and how Mendez herself was transformed into the musical's protagonist, Elphaba, the green-skinned girl who becomes the Wicked Witch of the West.

Mendez played Carrie in the 2018 Broadway revival of Carousel, for which she won the Tony Award for Best Featured Actress in a Musical.<ref>{{Cite web|last=Lefkowitz|first=Andy|date=10 June 2018|title=Carousel'''s Lindsay Mendez Wins Her First Tony Award: 'Be Your True Self and the World Will Take Note'|url=https://www.broadway.com/buzz/192469/carousels-lindsay-mendez-wins-her-first-tony-award-be-your-true-self-and-the-world-will-take-note/|url-status=live|archive-url=|archive-date=|access-date=7 January 2021|website=Broadway.com|language=en}}</ref> The production also starred Jessie Mueller and Joshua Henry.

Credits

 BroadwayCarousel as Carrie Pipperidge (2018)Significant Other as Laura (2017)Wicked as Elphaba (replacement) (2013–14)Godspell as "Bless The Lord" Performer (2011-2012)Everyday Rapture as Mennonite/Dance Captain (2010)Grease as Jan (2007–08)

 Off-BroadwayMerrily We Roll Along as Mary Flynn (2022–23)Significant Other as Laura (2015)The Winter's Tale (2014)Dogfight as Rose Fenny (2012)Everyday Rapture as Performer (2009)The Marvelous Wonderettes as Betty Jean (replacement) (2009)

 ReadingsNerds as Myrtle (2016)Princesses, National Alliance of Musical Theatre (2006)Princesses, Goodspeed Opera House (2004)

 Regional TheaterThe Rose Tattoo as Folk Singer/Giuseppina, Williamstown Theater Festival (2016)21 Chump Street as Naomi Rodriguez, Brooklyn Academy of Music (June 7, 2014)A Little More Alive as Lizzie, Kansas Repertory Theatre (2014)Footloose, Kansas City Starlight Theatre (2013)Jacques Brel is Alive and Well and Living in Paris, Two River Theater Company (2011)The Trouble with Doug, National Alliance of Musical Theatre (2010)Band Geeks!, National Alliance of Musical Theatre (2009)Footloose, Sacramento Music Circus (2008)Princesses, 5th Avenue Theater (2008)

 Encores!
 The Golden Apple as Helen (2017)

 Concerts35MM: A Musical Exhibition, The TimesCenter (2016)35MM as Voice 2, Urban Stages (2010)
 Rated RSO; The Music and Lyrics of Ryan Scott Oliver (2009)Go the Distance, and the Lyrics of David Zippel, Performer, Lincoln Center (2006)Go the Distance, and the Lyrics of David Zippel, Performer, Kaufman Center

Filmography
Television

Discography

 Three Points of Contact - Ryan Scott Oliver (2019) 
 The Other Josh Cohen: A Musical With Songs - Studio Cast Recording (2018)
 Band Geeks: A New Musical - Studio Cast Recording (2018)
 Carousel - 2018 Broadway Cast Recording (2018)21 Chump Street - The Musical - EP (2014)Dogfight - Original Cast Recording (2013)
 Kerrigan-Lowdermilk Live (2013)This Time, with Marco Paguia (2013)35MM: A Musical Exhibition - Original Cast Recording (2012)Godspell - The New Broadway Cast Recording (2011)Everyday Rapture - Original Broadway Cast Recording (2010)New York City Christmas, ASTEP Benefit album (2009)Grease'' Revival - New Broadway Cast Recording (2008)

Awards and nominations

References

External links
 
 
 

American musical theatre actresses
American women singers
Living people
1983 births
Tony Award winners
American musicians of Mexican descent
American people of Russian-Jewish descent
Drama Desk Award winners
Actresses from California
People from Norwalk, California
American stage actresses
21st-century American women
American actresses of Mexican descent